Wormser-Coleman House, also known as the Isaac Wormser House and John C. Coleman House, is a historical building built in 1876, located at 1834 California Street in San Francisco, California. It has been listed as a San Francisco Designated Landmark since 1973. As of 2022, the building is a private residence.

History 
The house was originally built by Isaac Wormser (1822–1895), an importer and jobber of liquor. 

In 1895, the house was sold to John C. Coleman, a businessman and politician. The property is on two lots that were merged together by Coleman in order to create a spacious yard. Coleman also expanded the house.

See also 
 List of San Francisco Designated Landmarks

References 

San Francisco Designated Landmarks
Victorian architecture in California
Italianate architecture in California